Luca Gentili (born 31 March 1972) is a former Italian footballer.

Biography
Gentili was a youth product of Bari, which he made his league debut on 6 June 1993, that match Bari losing to Cremonese 1–2. After several loan spells, he left for Serie C1 club Acireale and then for Serie C2 club Fasano. In summer 2000 he was signed by Catanzaro and won promotion to Serie C1 in 2003 and Serie B in 2004, which the latter as the backup of Silvio Lafuenti. In January 2005, he was signed by Serie C2 side Palazzolo and then Taranto. 

In summer 2006 he left for Serie D (non-professional) side Maceratese. 

in June 2010, he became a goalkeeping coach of Nocerina.

References

External links
 Lega-Calcio Profile  

Italian footballers
Serie A players
Serie B players
S.S.C. Bari players
A.S.D. Barletta 1922 players
U.S. Pistoiese 1921 players
U.S. Catanzaro 1929 players
Taranto F.C. 1927 players
Association football goalkeepers
Sportspeople from the Province of Macerata
1972 births
Living people
S.S. Maceratese 1922 players
Footballers from Marche